Viviennea gyrata is a moth in the family Erebidae first described by William Schaus in 1920. It is found in Guatemala.

References

Phaegopterina
Moths described in 1920